Dmitrijs Miļkevičs (born 6 December 1981 in Riga) is a former Latvian track athlete who competed in 400 metres and 800 metres.

Biography
Miļkevičs ran a career-best 46.44 in the 400 metres at the 2003 European Athletics U23 Championships in Bydgoszcz, Poland. He has won an NCAA championship while competing for the University of Nebraska. In the 2004 Summer Olympics, he was 14th in the 800 metres. In 2006, he set the Latvian record in the 800 metres with a time of 1:43.67, a record which still stands.

After Miļkevičs found out that, due to lack of funds, the Latvian Athletics Union wouldn't able to pay for Latvian delegation's start at the 2010 European Athletics Championships, he decided not to compete.

Personal bests
 400 m
 Indoor - 47.61 (2002)
 Outdoor - 46.44 (2003)
 600 y
 Indoor - 1:08.67 (2004)
 600 m
 Indoor - 1:15.60 (2005)
 800 m
 Indoor - 1:45.72 (2008)
 Outdoor - 1:43.67 (2006)
 1000 m
 Indoor - 2:22.82 (2005)

Achievements

2002
European Indoor Championships - Vienna, Austria
400 m, 19th, (47.61 seconds), PB
European Championships in Athletics - Munich, Germany
400 m, 23rd, (46.87 seconds)
2003
European Athletics U23 Championships - Bydgoszcz, Poland
400 m, (46.44 seconds) PB
2004
Big 12 Conference Indoor championships - United States
800 m, 1st, (1:48.82)
NCAA Indoor Championships - United States
800 m, 6th, (1:48.97)
Big 12 Conference Outdoor Championships - United States
800 m, 2nd, (1:48.07)
NCAA Outdoor Championships - United States
800 m, 6th, (1:47.51)
Summer Olympic Games - Athens, Greece
800 m, 14th, (1:46.62)
2005
European Indoor Championships - Madrid, Spain
800 m, 14th, (1:51.61)
Big 12 Conference Outdoor Championships - United States
800 m, 2nd, (1:45.10)
NCAA Outdoor Championships - United States
800 m, 1st, (1:44.74) PB
World Championships in Athletics - Helsinki, Finland
800 m, 42nd, (1:50.44)
2006
World Indoor Championships - Moscow, Russia
800 m 4th, (1:48.01)
European Athletics Championships - Gothenburg, Sweden
800 m, 4th, (1:46.70)

External links
 
 Dmitrijs Miļkevičs at University of Nebraska
 
 
 

1981 births
Living people
Latvian male middle-distance runners
Olympic athletes of Latvia
Athletes (track and field) at the 2004 Summer Olympics
Athletes (track and field) at the 2008 Summer Olympics
Athletes from Riga
People from Olaine
University of Nebraska–Lincoln alumni